Dario Baldauf (born 27 March 1985, in Bregenz) is an Austrian football player, who last played for Wolfsberger AC.

Club career
Baldauf came through at the Bundesliga Nachwuchs Zentrum Vorarlberg and made his professional debut in the 2003/2004 season with Second Division side Austria Lustenau. After spending half the 2004/2005 season at VfB Admira Mödling and the other half at SW Bregenz, Baldauf moved to SCR Altach in 2005. He was released by SC Rheindorf Altach in the Austrian Football Bundesliga in summer 2008 and signed than for FC Lustenau 07.

He predominantly plays as a right wingback, but is equally adept in the left wingback role.

External links
 

1985 births
Living people
People from Bregenz
Austrian footballers
SC Austria Lustenau players
FC Admira Wacker Mödling players
SW Bregenz players
SC Rheindorf Altach players
Austrian Football Bundesliga players
FC Lustenau players
Association football defenders
Footballers from Vorarlberg